The Yamaha XSR700 is a motorcycle manufactured by Yamaha. The production takes place in the Yamaha-MBK plant in Rouvroy, France. The launch of the naked bike took place in March 2016.

Concept 
Designed by the Japanese motorcycle customizer Shinja Kimura and further developed by the Yamaha design team in Monza, Italy, the XSR700 is designed to enhance the classic lines of the Yamaha XS 650 from 1976 combined with the modern technology of Yamaha MT-07. Central technical assemblies of the MT-07 such as engine, frame, chassis and brake system remained unchanged in the XSR 700. Conceptually, the XSR 700 is compared to the Ducati Scrambler 800.

270° crankshaft 
The XSR700's parallel-twin engine has a 270° crankshaft, whose two cylinders in the engine fire at an irregular interval. This format helps to harmonize the inertia forces inside the engine, resulting in a more responsive and "torquey" sensation for the rider, a feeling not unlike that of a V-twin.

References 

XSR700
Motorcycles introduced in 2016
Standard motorcycles